Tarutung is a town and the administrative capital (seat) of North Tapanuli Regency (Kabupaten Tapanuli Utara), North Sumatra, Sumatra, Indonesia. 

 in the Batak language means "durian" and town was named after the durian trees that grow there.

Batak
Regency seats of North Sumatra